Farokh Tarapore (born 3 August 1960) is an Indian sailor. He competed at the 1984 Summer Olympics, the 1988 Summer Olympics, and the 1992 Summer Olympics.

Awards and accolades

Asian Games

References

External links
 

1960 births
Living people
Indian male sailors (sport)
Olympic sailors of India
Sailors at the 1984 Summer Olympics – 470
Sailors at the 1988 Summer Olympics – 470
Sailors at the 1992 Summer Olympics – 470
Place of birth missing (living people)
Sailors at the 1982 Asian Games
Sailors at the 1986 Asian Games
Sailors at the 1990 Asian Games
Sailors at the 1994 Asian Games
Sailors at the 2002 Asian Games
Sailors at the 2006 Asian Games
Sailors at the 2010 Asian Games
Medalists at the 1982 Asian Games
Medalists at the 1986 Asian Games
Medalists at the 1990 Asian Games
Medalists at the 1994 Asian Games
Medalists at the 2010 Asian Games
Asian Games gold medalists for India
Asian Games silver medalists for India
Asian Games bronze medalists for India
Asian Games medalists in sailing
Recipients of the Arjuna Award